WCUA-LP (101.9 FM) was a radio station licensed to Peoria, Illinois, United States. The station was owned by Peoria Chinese Ministry Association.

The Federal Communications Commission cancelled WCUA-LP's license on May 13, 2015, due to the station having been silent for more than twelve months (since March 28, 2013).

References

External links
 

CUA-LP
CUA-LP
Radio stations established in 2007
Defunct radio stations in the United States
Radio stations disestablished in 2015
Defunct religious radio stations in the United States
2007 establishments in Illinois
2015 disestablishments in Illinois